The second Müller senate was the state government of Berlin between 2016 and 2021, sworn in on 8 December 2016 after Michael Müller was elected as Governing Mayor by the members of the Abgeordnetenhaus of Berlin. It was the 27th Senate of Berlin.

It was formed after the 2016 Berlin state election by the Social Democratic Party (SPD), The Left (LINKE) and Alliance 90/The Greens (GRÜNE). Excluding the Governing Mayor, the senate comprised ten members, called Senators. Four were members of the SPD, three were members of The Left, and three were members of the Greens.

The second Müller senate was succeeded by the Giffey senate on 21 December 2021.

Formation 

The previous Senate was a grand coalition government of the SPD and CDU led by Governing Mayor Michael Müller, who took office in December 2014.

The election took place on 18 September 2016, and resulted in significant losses for both governing parties. The Left improved to third place and the Greens saw a decline, while the AfD debuted at 14% and the FDP re-entered the Abgeordnetenhaus in sixth place. As a result of their losses, the SPD and CDU fell short of a majority, bringing the grand coalition to an end. Müller voiced his preference for a government with the Left and Greens; during the campaign, both the SPD and Greens had ruled out a coalition with the CDU.

On 26 September, Müller announced that he would seek exploratory talks between the SPD, Left, and Greens. Negotiations began on 6 October.

After intensive discussions, the three parties presented their 251-page coalition programme on 16 November. It was approved by the Greens at a party congress on 5 December, receiving only two votes against; the SPD followed on 6 December with almost 90% approval. The Left held a membership ballot on the coalition, with 89.3% of members voting in favour.

The Abgeordnetenhaus elected Müller as Governing Mayor on 8 December, winning 88 votes out of 158 cast.

Composition 
The composition of the Senate at the time of its dissolution was as follows:

References

Notes

External links 

Cabinets of Berlin
Cabinets established in 2016
2016 establishments in Germany
2021 disestablishments in Germany
Cabinets disestablished in 2021